Igbariam is a semi-rural  village, situated in Anambra East LGA, Anambra State. It is also referred to as Okalakwu Kingdom.

Igbariam is blessed with abundant fertile land, And is well-known for the Igbariam Farm Settlement built during the reign of M.I. Okpara in Eastern Nigeria. They are seen as the State's breadbasket.

Schools in Igbariam 
Chuwuemeka Odumegwu Ojukwu University, Igbariam Campus

Community Primary School, Igbariam

Onede Primary School, Igbariam

Farm Settlement Primary School, Igbariam

New Era  Primary School, Igbariam

Fraternita Nursery and Primary School, Igbariam

De Sophia Pitch Academy , Igbariam

Amanasaa Primary School, Igbariam

Aguoji  Primary School, Igbariam

External links 
 Igbariam

References 

Populated places in Adamawa State